Pool C of the 2015 Rugby World Cup began on 19 September and was completed on 11 October 2015. The pool was composed of New Zealand (the title holders), Argentina and Tongawho all qualified automatically for the tournament due to finishing in the top three positions in their pools in 2011along with the top European qualifier, Georgia, and the top African qualifier, Namibia.

After winning the first three of their matches, New Zealand became the first team to qualify for the 2015 Rugby World Cup Quarter Finals. After Tonga loss to New Zealand in their last Pool Match, Argentina became the second team from Pool C to qualify for the quarter finals. New Zealand eventually went on to win Rugby World Cup 2015, beating Australia 34 - 17 in the final.

Overall

All times are local United Kingdom time (UTC+01)

Tonga vs Georgia

Notes:
 Fetu'u Vainikolo surpassed Josh Taumalolo's record of 14 tries for his country, to become Tonga's record try scorer.	
 Merab Kvirikashvili surpassed Irakli Abuseridze's record of 85 caps for his country, to become Georgia's most capped player.	
 Vasil Lobzhanidze, at 18 years and 340 days, became the youngest ever player to appear in a World Cup match.
 Shalva Sutiashvili earned his 50th test cap for Georgia.

New Zealand vs Argentina

Notes:
 The 89,019 crowd, surpassed the tournament's biggest crowd for a match, set in the 2003 Rugby World Cup Final, of 82,957.
 New Zealand fielded the most experienced ever starting fifteen in international history.
 This marks the first time, New Zealand failed to win with a bonus point in the pool stages of the Rugby World Cup, ever since they were introduced.

New Zealand vs Namibia

Notes:
 This was the first ever match between these nations.
 Richie McCaw became the most capped New Zealander player at a Rugby World Cup, surpassing Sean Fitzpatrick's record of 17.

Argentina vs Georgia

Tonga vs Namibia

Notes:
 Tonga became the first team to name two captains in a Rugby World Cup match.
 The 3 tries scored by Namibia were the most scored by the team in a World Cup match.
 The 35 points scored by Tonga is the highest ever score it has posted in a Rugby World Cup game.
 Kurt Morath surpassed Pierre Hola's record of 317 points for his country to become Tonga's highest-ever point scorer.

New Zealand vs Georgia

Notes:
 This was the first ever match between these nations.

Argentina vs Tonga

Notes
 This was the first ever match between these nations.

Namibia vs Georgia

Notes:
 Alexander Todua earned his 50th test cap for Georgia.
 Theuns Kotzé surpassed Jaco Coetzee's record of 335 points to become Namibia top point scorer.	
 The losing bonus point for Namibia was the country's first-ever competition point in a Rugby World Cup.

New Zealand vs Tonga

Notes:
 Ma'a Nonu became the sixth All Blacks player to earn his 100th test cap.

Argentina vs Namibia

Notes:
 Martín Landajo earned his 50th test cap for Argentina.	
 Johnny Redelinghuys became the first Namibian player to earn his 50th test cap.

References

External links
 Official RWC 2015 Site

Pool C
Pool C
World Cup
World Cup
Rugby World Cup
Rugby World Cup